Střížovice may refer to:

 Střížovice (Jindřichův Hradec District), a village in the Czech Republic
 Střížovice (Kroměříž District), a village in the Czech Republic
 Střížovice (Plzeň-South District), a village in the Czech Republic